Kalmusky is a surname. Notable people with the surname include:

 David Kalmusky, American record producer, mixer, songwriter, and guitarist
 Ken Kalmusky (1945–2005), Canadian bassist